Luapula is a constituency of the National Assembly of Zambia. It covers a rural area (Lunga District) in southern Luapula Province.

List of MPs

References

Constituencies of the National Assembly of Zambia
1959 establishments in Northern Rhodesia
Constituencies established in 1959